In Greek mythology, Cynurus (Ancient Greek: Κύνουρος, Kúnouros) was a Mycenaean prince as the son of King Perseus and Andromeda, daughter of the Ethiopian rulers, King Cepheus and Queen Cassiopeia. He was the brother of Perses, Alcaeus, Sthenelus, Electryon, Mestor, Heleus, Gorgophone and Autochthe.

Cynurus was the eponymous founder of a city Cynura in Cynuria, Laconia, populated by Argive emigrants.

Notes

References 
 Pausanias, Description of Greece with an English Translation by W.H.S. Jones, Litt.D., and H.A. Ormerod, M.A., in 4 Volumes. Cambridge, MA, Harvard University Press; London, William Heinemann Ltd. 1918. . Online version at the Perseus Digital Library
 Pausanias, Graeciae Descriptio. 3 vols. Leipzig, Teubner. 1903.  Greek text available at the Perseus Digital Library.
 Stephanus of Byzantium, Stephani Byzantii Ethnicorum quae supersunt, edited by August Meineike (1790-1870), published 1849. A few entries from this important ancient handbook of place names have been translated by Brady Kiesling. Online version at the Topos Text Project.

Perseid dynasty
Princes in Greek mythology
Kings in Greek mythology
Mythology of Argos
Laconian mythology